Lambourn railway station was a railway station in Lambourn, Berkshire, UK, on the Lambourn Valley Railway.

History 
The station opened on 4 April 1898. It was the terminus and the most substantial station on the line. Currently, a street named "The Old Station Yard" runs through the now demolished site.

Goods traffic
Lambourn had an office and extensive freight facilities, including a goods yard with a loading dock, goods shed, locomotive shed, a coal yard and office, and cattle pens. The station was also busy with racehorses, with traffic peaking between 1920 and 1935.

Closure
The station closed to all traffic on 4 January 1960.

References 

Lambourn Valley Railway
Disused railway stations in Berkshire
Former Great Western Railway stations
Railway stations in Great Britain opened in 1898
Railway stations in Great Britain closed in 1960
1898 establishments in England
1960 disestablishments in England
Lambourn